Tori & Dean: Home Sweet Hollywood is an American reality television series that aired on Oxygen from March 20, 2007, to January 31, 2012. The series was titled Tori & Dean: Inn Love for its first two seasons. In 2013, Spelling released a book which stated that Oxygen cancelled the series stating they were taking the network in a different direction.

Premise
The series follows actress Tori Spelling and her second husband, actor Dean McDermott. The first two seasons follow the couple as they move out of Los Angeles and look for a bed & breakfast to invest Spelling's $800,000 inheritance.  Drama ensues as the newlyweds hunt for an affordable inn location, purchase and renovate the inn to match their modern style, manage the inn and attempt to fit in with their new local community of Fallbrook, all while Spelling is eight months pregnant with her son, Liam. The couple named their revamped inn, Chateau La Rue, after Spelling's pug called Mimi La Rue. On April 26, 2007, the Fallbrook Village News reported that Spelling & McDermott did not actually purchase the property, on the August 28, 2007, episode, Tori claimed that they had leased to own.

Season 2 premiered on August 14, 2007 and featured 10 new episodes. The McDermotts leave Chateau La Rue and the bed and breakfast industry.

Season 3 premiered on June 17, 2008, with the new name, Tori & Dean: Home Sweet Hollywood, and broke ratings records for the Oxygen Network, with an estimated 1.4 million viewers. In addition, the episodes were extended from thirty minutes to one hour. In the third season, Tori and Dean have moved back to Los Angeles and are no longer keeping the inn. Throughout most of this season, Tori is pregnant. She gives birth to her daughter, Stella, at the end of the season.

Season 4 of Tori & Dean: Home Sweet Hollywood premiered on May 26, 2009, on Oxygen. The show now follows Tori and Dean as they juggle their careers with being parents to their two children. The season premiere became the most-watched opener among Oxygen's core demographic of women 18-49 in the network's nine-year history.

Season 5 of Tori & Dean: Home Sweet Hollywood premiered on April 5, 2010, with Season 6 premiering on November 29, 2011.

Episodes

Season 1

Season 2

Season 3

Season 4

Season 5

Season 6

References

External links
 

2000s American reality television series
2010s American reality television series
2007 American television series debuts
2012 American television series endings
Oxygen (TV channel) original programming
Television shows set in Los Angeles
Spelling family
Television series by World of Wonder (company)